Plagiochila is a large, common, and widespread genus of liverworts in the order Jungermanniales. It is a member of the family  Plagiochilaceae within that order. There may be anywhere from 500 to 1300 species, most of them from the tropics; the exact number is still under revision.  The genus also has a wide distribution in temperate and arctic areas.

Species in Plagiochila 

 Plagiochila amboynensis
 Plagiochila asplenioides
 Plagiochila belangeriana
 Plagiochila biondiana
 Plagiochila blepharophora
 Plagiochila capillaris
 Plagiochila chinensis
 Plagiochila corticola
 Plagiochila crassitexta
 Plagiochila delavayi
 Plagiochila deltoidea
 Plagiochila determii
 Plagiochila euryphyllon
 Plagiochila fasciculata
 Plagiochila firma
 Plagiochila flexuosa
 Plagiochila fordiana
 Plagiochila formosae
 Plagiochila frondescens
 Plagiochila fruticosa
 Plagiochila ghatiensis
 Plagiochila gollanii
 Plagiochila gregaria
 Plagiochila hakkodensis
 Plagiochila hamulispina
 Plagiochila handelii
 Plagiochila hokinensis
 Plagiochila japonica
 Plagiochila lacerata
 Plagiochila laetevirens
 Plagiochila magnifolia
 Plagiochila minor
 Plagiochila multipinnula
 Plagiochila nepalensis
 Plagiochila ovalifolia
 Plagiochila perserrata
 Plagiochila porelloides
 Plagiochila pseudofirma
 Plagiochila pulcherrima
 Plagiochila punctata
 Plagiochila recurvata
 Plagiochila rigidula
 Plagiochila robustissima
 Plagiochila saclpellifolia
 Plagiochila sawadae
 Plagiochila semidecurrens
 Plagiochila shanghaica
 Plagiochila shimizuana
 Plagiochila sikutzuisana
 Plagiochila spathulaefolia
 Plagiochila subacanthophylla
 Plagiochila tobagensis
 Plagiochila tongtschuana
 Plagiochila torquescens
 Plagiochila trabeculata
 Plagiochila vexans
 Plagiochila wallichiana
 Plagiochila wilsoniana
 Plagiochila wolframii
 Plagiochila yokogurensis
 Plagiochila yunnanensis
 Plagiochila yuwandakensis
 Plagiochila zonata

References

Jungermanniales
Jungermanniales genera